Hibiscus socotranus is a species of flowering plant in the family Malvaceae. It is found only in Yemen. Its natural habitat is subtropical or tropical dry shrubland.

References

socotranus
Endemic flora of Socotra
Endangered plants
Taxonomy articles created by Polbot